Fairview is a village in Belmont and Guernsey counties in the U.S. state of Ohio. The population was 67 as of the 2020 census. It is part of the Wheeling metropolitan area.

History
Fairview was platted in 1814. The name Fairview is commendatory. A post office called Fairview was established in 1823, and remained in operation until 1991.

Geography
Fairview is located at  (40.056951, -81.233665).

Demographics

2000 census
As of the 2000 census, there were 81 people, 26 households, and 21 families residing in the village. The population density was 190.8 people per square mile (74.5/km2). There were 35 housing units at an average density of 82.4 per square mile (32.2/km2). The racial makeup of the village was 100% White.

There were 26 households, out of which 30.8% had children under the age of 18 living with them, 69.2% were married couples living together, 15.4% had a female householder with no husband present, and 15.4% were non-families. 7.7% of all households were made up of individuals, and 3.8% had someone living alone who was 65 years of age or older. The average household size was 3.12 and the average family size was 3.41.

In the village, the population was spread out, with 28.4% under the age of 18, 7.4% from 18 to 24, 21.0% from 25 to 44, 30.9% from 45 to 64, and 12.3% who were 65 years of age or older. The median age was 40 years. For every 100 females there were 102.5 males. For every 100 females age 18 and over, there were 100.0 males.

The median income for a household in the village was $32,250, and the median income for a family was $33,750. Males had a median income of $31,250 versus $13,125 for females. The per capita income for the village was $10,561. Additionally, 8.3% of families, or 9.1% of the population, lived below the poverty line, including nobody under eighteen and 16.7% of those over 64.

2010 census
As of the 2010 census,. The racial makeup of the village was 97.6% White, 1.2% African American, and 1.2% from two or more races. Hispanics or Latinos of any race made up 1.2% of the population.

There were 32 households, of which 25.0% contained children under the age of 18. In total, 56.3% of the households were married couples living together, 12.5% had a female householder with no husband present, 3.1% had a male householder with no wife present, and 28.1% were non-families. Out of all households, 21.9% were made up of individuals, and 6.3% had someone living alone who was 65 years of age or older. The average household size was 2.59 and the average family size was 3.13.

The median age in the village was 43.3 years. 20.5% of residents were under the age of 18, 14.3% were between the ages of 18 and 24, 16.8% were from 25 to 44, 31.3% were from 45 to 64, and 16.9% were 65 years of age or older. The gender makeup of the village was 56.6% male and 43.4% female.

Notable people
 Walter P. Lane, Confederate general

 Eliza Wallace, math professor at Knoxville College (HBCU); established the Eliza B. Wallace Hospital in Tennessee to provide medical care and training for the African American community

References

Villages in Belmont County, Ohio
Villages in Ohio
Villages in Guernsey County, Ohio
1814 establishments in Ohio
Populated places established in 1814